Merkez, Beykoz is the city center of Beykoz district and one of its 45 neighborhoods on the Anatolian/Asian side of Istanbul.

Looking at its administrative borders, Yalıköy and Ortaçeşme neighborhoods lie in the north; to the northeast is Akbaba; Elmalı village is to the east; İncirköy neighborhood is to the southeast; Gümüşsuyu is to the south; and to the west is the Bosphorus Strait.

The 500-year-old Onçeşmeler (İshak Ağa Fountain), the work of Mimar Sinan and taking its latest form in 1746 AD/1159 AH, is located in the square on the coast. The historical Serbostani Mustafa Ağa Mosque (1809 AD/1229 AH) stands next to it. The upper quarter was known as the Armenian Quarter with its Surp Nigoğayos Church first built in 1776.

A fishing community thrives on the coast of Merkez.

References 

Beykoz
Bosphorus
Neighbourhoods of Beykoz
Fishing communities in Turkey